NetWAR is a video game developed by American studio Semi Logic and published by Headland Digital Media.

Gameplay
NetWAR was a multiplayer internet action game involving dozens of players, with each player represented as an individual warrior on a large battlefield.

Reception
Next Generation reviewed the game, rating it three stars out of five, and stated that "NetWAR has most of the right parts in place to be a fun, multiplayer-only, online game, and it's priced to sell."

Reviews
Computer Gaming World #164 (Mar 1998)
The Adrenaline Vault

References

1997 video games
Multiplayer online games
Shooter video games
Video games developed in the United States
Windows games
Windows-only games